Vintov (from винт meaning a screw) is a Russian masculine surname, its feminine counterpart is Vintova. It may refer to

Maksim Vintov (born 1985), Russian football player
Roman Vintov (born 1978), Russian football player

Russian-language surnames